Amarapuri  is a town in Gaidakot Municipality in Nawalparasi District in the Lumbini Zone of southern Nepal. It became a municipality in May 2014 by merging the existing Mukundapur, Amarapuri, Gaidakot, Nawalparasi, VDCs. At the time of the 1991 Nepal census it had a population of 5,451 living in 967 households. Amarapuri has three high schools, the Shree Laxmi Higher Secondary School, Amar Jyoti Higher Secondary School and Amar English Higher Secondary Boarding School.

Located around 160 km west of the capital city Kathmandu, Amarapuri is the small village bounded by Mukundapur VDC in the east, Rajahar VDC in the west and the Narayani River in the south and Ratanpur VDC in the north. This village is beautifully located on a hilly area above the plain that adjoins the Narayani River. It is situated in the lap of Mahabharata hill range

The main occupation of population is agriculture and with most families dependent upon remittance for the earning (as well as living). Amarapuri daily exports milk from two major dairies, Amarapuri Dhugdha and Amar Bahu Udhasya Sahakari Sastha.

School and colleges 
1 Shree Pancha Jyoti lower secondary school.

2 Shree Laxmi higher secondary school.

3 Janamukhi Adharsa Bahumukhi campus.

4 Amar Jyoti secondary school.

5 Unique boarding school.

6 Amar English higher secondary boarding school.

7 Bijay Jyoti primary school.

8 Shree Bal Udaya Primary school

Banks and Financial Institution 
1 NIC Asia Bank.

2 Citizens Bank.

3 Shangrila Development Bank.

4 Bank of Kathmandu.

References

Populated places in Nawalpur District